Michelle D. Gass (Petkers) is an American businesswoman who currently serves as the CEO and Director of Levi Corporation, a position she has held since December 2022.

Education and career
Gass has a bachelor's degree in chemical engineering from Worcester Polytechnic Institute and an MBA from the University of Washington.

Gass is a Starbucks veteran who took the chain in a new direction in 1996. She "helped make 'frappuccino' a household word" which became Starbucks' $2 billion brand in 2011.

Before joining Kohl's, Gass worked at Procter & Gamble and at Starbucks. She started with Kohls in 2013 as their first chief customer officer. She led the creation of Kohl's Greatness Agenda in 2014, was named chief merchandising officer in 2015, and was promoted to be the CEO-elect in 2017. With a compensation of $12.34 million, she was ranked as 71st on the "100 Most Overpaid CEOs 2020", a report by As You Sow. Gass has been a member of the board of directors of PepsiCo since March 2019.

In 2005, Gass was awarded the Ichabod Washburn Young Alumni for Professional Achievement award by Worcester Polytechnic Institute and in 2007, she was named a Woman to Watch by Advantage Age. In 2018, Homeworld Business named Gass one of its "Players" and a person to watch in housewares in the coming year.

In November 2022, it was announced that Gass would be stepping down as Kohl's CEO by early December and become the CEO-in-waiting for Levi Strauss & Co.

Personal life
Gass was raised in Maine. She married Scott Gass on August 20, 1994. They have two children named Megan and Will.

References 

Living people
American women chief executives
Women corporate executives
Year of birth missing (living people)
Worcester Polytechnic Institute alumni
American retail chief executives
University of Washington alumni
Businesspeople from Maine
Starbucks people
20th-century American businesspeople
20th-century American businesswomen
21st-century American businesspeople
21st-century American businesswomen